Coltons Point is an unincorporated community in what is popularly called the "Seventh District" of St. Mary's County, Maryland, United States.  Here are located a small historical museum and a lighthouse.  Seasonal boat service at times carries visitors the short distance to the shrinking, uninhabited St. Clement's Island, where in 1634 the first European settlers arriving in Maryland landed and celebrated the first Catholic Mass in English-speaking North America. It was listed on the National Register of Historic Places in 1972.  The ZIP Code for Coltons Point is 20626.

References

Unincorporated communities in St. Mary's County, Maryland
Unincorporated communities in Maryland